Kateřina Vaňková (born 30 December 1989) is a Czech former professional tennis player.

She has won 15 singles and 14 doubles titles on the ITF Women's Circuit. On 20 April 2015, she reached her best singles ranking of world No. 218. On 18 April 2016, she peaked at No. 192 in the WTA doubles rankings.

Vaňková made her WTA Tour debut at the 2015 Prague Open, partnering Markéta Vondroušová in the doubles draw. The pair lost their first-round match against Kateryna Bondarenko and Eva Hrdinová.

ITF Circuit finals

Singles: 27 (15 titles, 12 runner-ups)

Doubles: 23 (14 titles, 9 runner-ups)

References

External links

 
 

1989 births
Living people
Tennis players from Prague
Czech female tennis players
Universiade medalists in tennis
Universiade bronze medalists for the Czech Republic
Medalists at the 2013 Summer Universiade